Peziza ampliata is a species of apothecial fungus belonging to the family Pezizaceae. It appears as brown cups with a wrinkled interior, up to 3 cm across. It occurs, usually in small groups, on rotting wood, especially oak. It is largely a European species but has been recorded in the United States.

References

Peziza ampliata at Species Fungorum

Pezizaceae
Fungi described in 1822
Taxa named by Christiaan Hendrik Persoon